St. Charles Medical Center – Redmond is a hospital in Redmond, Oregon, United States.  It is a level 3 trauma center.  St. Charles medical center [SCMC-R] is owned and operated by St. Charles Health System, Inc. (SCHS), a private, not-for-profit Oregon corporation. SCHS also owns and operates the St. Charles Medical Center - Bend.

History 
Central Oregon District Hospital opened on July 1, 1952. On January 1, 2001, Central Oregon District Hospital and St. Charles Medical center merged to create Cascade Healthcare Services. Later renamed to Cascade Healthcare Community, inc. As part of the merger the hospital was renamed to Central Oregon Community Hospital. In 2003 the hospital's name was changed again to the current St. Charles Medical Center Redmond.

See also 
List of hospitals in Oregon

References 

Hospital buildings completed in 1952
Buildings and structures in Redmond, Oregon
Hospitals in Oregon
Hospitals established in 1952
1952 establishments in Oregon